The Franklin County Courthouse, located at 39 W. Oneida St. in Preston in Franklin County, Idaho, was built in 1939.  It was listed on the National Register of Historic Places in 1987.

It is Art Deco in style, principally designed by Salt Lake City architect Hyrum C. Pope.  It is "tall, massive, and monumental" in its village setting.

Hyrum Pope died unexpectedly of a heart attack while inspecting the construction of the building; W.F. Thomas of Pope's firm, Pope & Burton, completed the supervision of the construction.

References

Courthouses on the National Register of Historic Places in Idaho
Art Deco architecture in Idaho
Government buildings completed in 1939
Franklin County, Idaho